Marcgravia rectiflora is a plant species native to Peru and Central America.

Native locations 
Columbia
Cuba
Dominican Republic
Guatemala
Haiti
Honduras 
Leeward is.
Peru 
Puerto Rico

References 

Flora of Peru
rectiflora